Jacques Locas (January 7, 1954 – August 20, 2006) was a Canadian professional ice hockey forward.

Early life 
Locas was born in Saint-Jérôme, Quebec. As a youth, he played in the 1966 Quebec International Pee-Wee Hockey Tournament with the Quebec Beavers minor ice hockey team.

Career 
Locas played 187 games in the World Hockey Association with the Michigan Stags, Baltimore Blades, Indianapolis Racers, Cincinnati Stingers and Calgary Cowboys.

References

External links

Notice of death 

1954 births
2006 deaths
Baltimore Blades players
Calgary Cowboys players
Canadian ice hockey centres
Cincinnati Stingers players
French Quebecers
Hampton Gulls (SHL) players
Ice hockey people from Quebec
Indianapolis Racers players
Los Angeles Kings draft picks
Michigan Stags players
People from Saint-Jérôme
Saint-Jérôme Alouettes players
Quebec Remparts players